Homayoun Teymouri (born 11 August 1994) is an Iranian weightlifter. In 2017, at the Islamic Solidarity Games held in Baku, Azerbaijan, he won the silver medal in the men's +105kg event. At the 2017 Asian Indoor and Martial Arts Games held in Ashgabat, Turkmenistan he won the bronze medal in the men's +105kg event.

References

External links 
 

Living people
1994 births
Place of birth missing (living people)
Iranian male weightlifters
Islamic Solidarity Games medalists in weightlifting
21st-century Iranian people
Islamic Solidarity Games competitors for Iran